The 13th competition for the East German national football cup, the FDGB-Pokal, was held in the 1963-64 season.

The competition began with a qualifying round for the 65 clubs of the 2nd DDR-Liga that had been dissolved at the end of the previous season. They were joined by 17 finalists of the Bezirkspokal competitions. 31 teams from the DDR-Liga joined in the first round, the 14 DDR-Oberliga teams only joined in the third round. By then all but two Bezirkspokal and 2nd DDR-Liga teams each had been eliminated.

The fourth round saw the eleven remaining Oberliga teams, four DDR-Liga sides and BSG Empor Neustrelitz as the last club of those that had qualified via the Bezirkspokal. Neustrelitz went out following a 1–2 defeat at the hands of SC Motor Jena, as well as last year's finalist BSG Chemie Zeitz who were eliminated by a 0–2 loss against SC Aufbau Magdeburg. ASG Vorwärts Neubrandenburg were the only DDR-liga side to reach the quarter finals.

Here Neubrandenburg suffered a 2–7 defeat against SC Leipzig who went on to eliminate defending cup winners Motor Zwickau by a 3–2 extra time win. The second finalist was SC Aufbau Magdeburg who had beaten SC Dynamo Berlin in the quarter finals and SC Motor Jena in the semis.

Qualification round

Replays

First round

Second round

Replays

Third round

Replay

Fourth round 
(played on 15 March 1964)

Quarter finals 
(22 April 1964)

Semi finals 
(20 May 1964)

Final

Statistics

Match report 
The cup final, played 5 weeks after the end of the DDR-Oberliga saw the third-placed team of SC Leipzig play eleventh-placed SC Aufbau Magdeburg. After Leipzig's second goal, following a solo effort from Frenzel, finished by winger Engelhardt, Magdeburg pushed to avert the impending defeat and scored after a lonely run by Hermann Stöcker and a finish by Walter. This goal rallied Magdeburg and a short freekick was used to equalize, again by Walter. As two players had had to be treated for injuries, referee Kunze—described as heavy-set and not always at the top of the game added some more time. And with just seconds left, Stöcker capitalized on a bad clearance by Leipzig's goalkeeper to score the winning goal.

References 

FDGB-Pokal seasons
East
Cup